Nil Gavani Kaadhali is a 1969 Indian Tamil-language crime thriller film, directed by C. V. Rajendran and written by Chitralaya Gopu. The film stars Jaishankar, Bharathi, Nagesh, Jayanthi and Vijaya Lalitha. It was released on 7 March 1969, and fared well at the box office.

Plot 

A gang of diamond smugglers led by a wily chief (M. N. Nambiar) is assisted by Babu (Major Sundararajan). His niece Malathy (Bharathi) meets the CID officer Shankar (Jaishankar) and hands over a packet at an airport lounge to be handed over to her uncle. and her elder sister Radha (Jayanthi) meets the pal Seetha Raman (Nagesh) and falls in love with him. The two pairs go through several adventures and expose the villains.

Cast 
Jaishankar as CID Shankar
Bharathi as Malathy
Nagesh as Seetharaman
Jayanthi as Radha
Vijaya Lalitha as Sheela
M. N. Nambiar as gang leader
Major Sundarrajan as Babu
Senthamari
Dhanaraj
Henry Daniel
Varadachari
V. R. Thilakam as Myna
Malathi

Soundtrack 
Music was composed by M. S. Viswanathan and lyrics were written by Vaali.

Reception 
Film critic and historian Randor Guy wrote that the film would be "Remembered For The music, interesting story line, impressive performances by the actors, taut direction, cinematography and editing".

References

External links 
 

1960s crime thriller films
1960s Tamil-language films
1969 films
Films directed by C. V. Rajendran
Films scored by M. S. Viswanathan
Indian black-and-white films
Indian crime thriller films